Claim Jumper Restaurant and Saloon is an American restaurant chain with more than 30 locations. The company is based in Houston, Texas.

History
Restaurateur Craig Nickoloff opened the first Claim Jumper in Los Alamitos, California, on September 27, 1977. The original restaurant had a large menu and an atmosphere inspired by California's Gold Rush of 1849.

Acquisition by Landry’s, Inc.

In September 2010, the chain filed for bankruptcy and was slated to be auctioned off. In October 2010, Landry's, Inc. acquired Claim Jumper, with a bid of $76.6 million. Landry's President/CEO Tilman J. Fertitta relocated the company's headquarters from Irvine, California, to Landry's corporate headquarters in the Uptown area of Houston.

Locations 
, the restaurant chain has locations in Arizona, California, Illinois, Louisiana, Nevada, Oregon, and Washington.

Due to the onset of the COVID-19 pandemic and the fact that part of the business was a buffet, the chain closed some of its locations, including Long Beach, California and at Opry Mills in Nashville, Tennessee. and Lynnwood, Washington.

References

External links
 Official website

Regional restaurant chains in the United States
Companies that filed for Chapter 11 bankruptcy in 2010
Restaurants established in 1977
Steakhouses in the United States
1977 establishments in California
Companies based in Houston
2010 mergers and acquisitions
American companies established in 1977